The Robert Morris Colonials women represent Robert Morris University in CHA women's ice hockey during the 2019-20 NCAA Division I women's ice hockey season.

Offseason
7/23: Incoming Freshman Goalie Raygan Kirk was the youngest player to be invited to the Canadian National Women's Development Camp.
8/27: Former RMU star Jen Kindret was added to the coaching staff.

Standings

Roster

2019–20 Colonials

2019-20 schedule
Source:

|-
!colspan=12 style=" "| Regular Season

|-
!colspan=12 style=" "|CHA Tournament

Awards and honors

RMU had three players honored with CHA All-Conference First Team laurels, Senior forward Jaycee Gephard earned her spot with her 28 assists enough to be second highest in the nation. Junior Emily Curlett was a first team defender, as the nation's leader in power play goals. Lexi Templeman (Forward, Second Team), Maggie Burbidge (Forward, All-Rookie Team) and Raygan Kirk (Goaltender, All-Rookie Team) rounded out CHA Regular season awards for Robert Morris.

Defender Jordan Mortlock was named to the 2020 All-Tournament team.

References

Robert Morris
Robert Morris Lady Colonials ice hockey seasons
Robert
Robert